The Mokshas (also Mokshans, Moksha people, in ) comprise a Mordvinian ethnic group belonging to the Volgaic branch of the Finno-Ugric peoples. They live in the Russian Federation, mostly near the Volga River and the Moksha River, a tributary of the Oka River.

Their native language is Mokshan, one of the two surviving members of the Mordvinic branch of the Uralic language family. According to a 1994 Russian census, 49% of the autochthonal Finnic population in Mordovia identified themselves as Mokshas, totaling more than 180,000 people. Most Mokshas belong to the Russian Orthodox Church; other religions practised by Mokshas include Lutheranism
and paganism.

Name

William of Rubruck, the Franciscan friar whom King Louis IX of France sent as an ambassador to the Mongols in the 1250s, called them "Moxel". The same term appears in the Persian/Arabic 14th-century  chronicle of  Rashid-al-Din. According to popular tradition the Russians first used the term "Mordva" to refer only to the  Erzya people but later used it for both the Erzyas and the Mokshas. The term "Moksha" begins to appear in Russian sources in the 17th century.

Local  names for the Mokshas include: 
Мокшет or Мокшень ломатть ("Moksha people") in Moksha
Мокшане or Мордва-Мокша in Russian
Muqşılar in Tatar
Мăкшăсем in Chuvash
Мокшот in Erzya

History

Prehistory

The breakup of the Volga Finns into separate groups is believed to have begun around 1200 BC. The Moksha people cannot be traced earlier because they did not possess a distinctive burial tradition before that time. According to archeological data, bodies in early Mokshan burials were oriented with their heads to the south. Herodotus mentions Androphagi living in the forests between the upper waters of the Dnieper and Don, north of Scythia; this people is believed to be identifiable with the Gorodets culture, and with the early Moksha, making Herodotus's report the first appearance of the Mokshas in written history. Herodotus also describes the  Scythian-Persian war of 516-512 BC, which involved the entire population of the Middle Volga. During this war the Sarmatians forced out the Scythians and subdued some Moksha clans. During the 2nd and 3rd centuries AD, Antes, Slavs, Mokshas and Erzyas became the most numerous and powerful population in East Europe. By the end of the 4th century, most Mokshas had joined the Hunnic tribal alliance, taken part in the defeat of the  Ostrogothic Empire in 377, and subsequently moved eastward and settled in Pannonia. Evidence of the Hunnic connection includes Mokshan battle harnesses, especially the bits and psalia, which are identical to early Hunnic battle harnesses. Archeological data show that the boundaries of Moksha territory did not change between the fourth and 8th centuries. In 450, the Mokshas were in alliance with a people of the Middle Volga known as the Burtas, who were possibly Alans.

Middle Ages

During the second Arab-Khazar War in 737, Arab armies under the command of Marwan ibn Muhammad reached the right bank of the Volga and came into conflict with the Burtas on their way to the left or "Khazar" bank of Volga. Circa 889–890, the Khazars were at war with the Burtas, the Oghuz and the Pechenegs. In 913, after a war between the Arsiyah and the Rus' at Atil began, five thousand Rus' survivors escaped up the Volga where most of them were killed by the Burtas. In 932, the Khazar King Aaron formed a war alliance with the Oghuz. Circa 940, during the reign of King Joseph, the Khazars entered into an alliance with the Burtas.  Afterwards the Burtas Seliksa principality became a vassal of the Khazar khanate. In 965, Sviatoslav I of Kiev  “attacked the Khazars' allies, captured Sarkel and Bulgaria, and reached Semender” according to Ibn Haukal. Two years later, after the Great Flood, he seized and destroyed Atil. At the beginning of the 10th century Almush (Almış) the king of Volga Bulgaria took control of the "Khazar tribute". He converted to Islam, formed an alliance with the caliph of Baghdad Al-Muktafi, and founded a trading post at the mouth of the Oka river. The Kievan prince Vladimir seized Bolghar in 985. King Almush and Prince Vladimir signed a peace and trade treaty in 1006 which was the beginning of an "eternal peace" that lasted for 80 years. War for domination of the Oka River and the Erzyan fortress Obran Osh started again in 1120. Prince Yury of the city of Vladimir seized Oshel in 1220 and demanded a reduction of Bulgarian influence over the Erzyan kingdom (Purgas Rus). The latter was allied with Volga Bulgaria. Vladimirian princes captured and destroyed Obran Osh in 1221 and founded Nizhny Novgorod on the site. The Erzyan King Purgaz and the Mokshan King Puresh were at war and while Purgaz was allied with Volga Bulgaria, Puresh was an ally of Prince Yury. In 1230 Purgaz laid siege to Nizhny Novgorod but was defeated. After that Puresh's son Prince Atämaz with his Polovtsi allies raided into Purgaz's lands and completely destroyed his kingdom.
As recorded by Rashid-al-Din in his Jami al-Tawarikh, 4 September 1236 was the date on which the sons of Jochi - Batu, Orda, and Berke, Ugedei's son Kadan, Chagatai's grandson Büri, and Genghis Khan's son Kulkan declared war on the Mokshas, Burtas and Erzyas. This war ended on 23 August 1237 with a crucial victory for the Mongols at the Black Forest close to the border of the Principality of Ryazan.

King Puresh of the Mokshans submitted to Batu Khan and was required personally to lead his army as a vassal in Mongol-Tartar military campaigns.
At the beginning of 1241 the Mongol army seized Kiev, then crossed the Carpathian mountains and invaded Poland. Roger Bacon in his Opus Majus writes that the Mokshas were in the vanguard of the Mongol army and took part in the capture of Lublin and Zawichost in Poland. Benedict Polone reports that the Mokshan army suffered serious losses during the capture of Sandomierz in February and Krakow in March of the same year. On 9 April 1241 the Mongol army defeated the allied Polish and German armies at the Battle of Legnica. It is believed King Puresh was slain in that battle. Shortly after that battle the Mokshan army declared to Batu that they refused to fight against Germans. According to reports by William Rubruck and Roger Bacon, the Mokshas had previously negotiated with the Germans and Bohemians regarding the possibility of joining their side in order to escape from their forced vassalage to Batu. It is known that Subutai ordered the punishment of the conspirators; thousands of Mokshas were put to death, but approximately a third escaped and returned to their homeland. Another third remained in the vanguard of the Mongol army and marched into Hungary through the Verecke Pass in March 1242, according to the Hungarian bishop Stephan II and Matthew of Paris.

Geographic distribution 
Mokshas live mostly in the central and western parts of the Republic of Mordovia, and neighbouring areas of Tambov Oblast and in the western and central parts of Penza Oblast. Populations of Mokshas also live in Orenburg Oblast, Bashkortostan, Tatarstan, Altai Krai, as well as in diaspora communities in Estonia, Kazakhstan, the United States, and Australia.

Culture

Language
Mokshas speak the Moksha language, which is a member of the Mordvinic branch of the Uralic languages.

Mythology
In traditional Mokshan mythology the world was created by Ińe Narmon (Great Bird), referred to in folklore as Akša Loksti (White Swan). The first thing Ińe Narmon created was water. Yakśarga (Duck) brought sand from the bottom of the sea and Ińe Narmon took the sand and with it formed the earth with Ińe Šufta (The Great Tree) on it. Ińe Narmon made its nest on Ińe Šufta, which is usually referred to as Kelu (birch) in folklore. Akša Kal (White Sturgeon) carried the earth with the roots of Ińe Šufta on its back. Ińe Narmon had three nestlings: Tsofks (Nightingale), Kuku (Cuckoo),  and Ožarga (Skylark). Tsofks chose bushes and willows for his home, Kuku settled in the forest, and Ožarga went to the meadows. Another of the old deities mentioned in Mokshan folklore was Mešavane (Mother Bee). Since the Christianization of the Mokshans the Mokshan Supreme God has usually been called Värden Škai (Supreme Creator).

According to later legends the creation of the world went through several stages: first the Idemevs (Devil) was asked by the God to bring sand from the bottom of the great sea. Idemevs hid some sand in his mouth. When Värden Škai started creating the earth, this hidden sand started to grow in the mouth of Idemevs. He had to spit it out and thus chasms and mountains appeared on the previously level and beautiful earth. The first humans created by Värden Škai could live for 700–800 years and were giants 99 arshins (yards) tall.  The underworld in Mokshan mythology was ruled by Mastoratia. The souls of heroes, clan elders and warriors slain in battle travelled after death to the emerald green isle of Usiya, where they sat at a long table together with the great King Ťušťen drinking pure mead.

Famous people of Moksha descent
 Vasily Shukshin, Soviet writer, actor and film director
 Evgeny Chichvarkin, Russian businessman
 Alexander Ovechkin, Russian ice hockey player
 Oleg Maskaev, Russian boxer

Sources
Финно-угры и балты в эпоху средневековья (Археология СССР). М., 1987. С. 398-404
Кулаков В И. Древности пруссов VI-XIII вв. САИ. Вып. Г1-9 М., 1990
Финно-угры и балты... С. 411-419
Jaskanis J. Jacwiez w badaniach archeologicznych. Stan i perspektywy badawce // Rocznik biatostocki. T. XIV. Biatystok. 1981. S. 49–67.
Nowakowski W. Osiedia Kultury bogaczcwskiej - proba podsumowania stanu badart // WA. LI-1. 1986–1990.
Таутавичюс А.3. Балтские племена на территории Литвы в I тысячелетии н.э. // Из древнейшей истории балтских народов (по данным археологии и антропологии). Рига, 1980. С. 81, 82
Kevin Alan Brook. The Jews of Khazaria. 2nd ed. Rowman & Littlefield Publishers, Inc, 2010.

References

External links
Webpage of the Zubu district of Mordovia,  with historical and cultural information on the Moksha people in Russian, English and French
Mokshen Pravda newspaper
Moksha - English - Moksha online dictionary
News in Moksha
Mokshan mythology
Mokshan folklore
Mokshan names
Moksha portal - Mokshan history, music and video
The periodic table in the Moksha language
Mokshan pop music

Moksha people
Finnic peoples
Indigenous peoples of Europe
Ethnic groups in Russia